Tonopah Airport  is a county-owned, public-use airport located seven nautical miles (13 km) east of the central business district of Tonopah, in Nye County, Nevada, United States.

It incorporates the former Tonopah Army Airfield, a World War II installation where many units of the USAAF, such as the 357th Fighter Group, trained.  The 357th (whose pilots included Chuck Yeager and Bud Anderson among others) later flew P-51 Mustang fighters against the German Luftwaffe, from their base at Leiston, on the south-eastern coast of Britain.

Facilities and aircraft 
It has two asphalt paved runways: 15/33 is 7,161 by 80 feet (2,183 x 24 m) and 11/29 is 6,196 by 50 feet (1,889 x 15 m).

For the 12-month period ending November 30, 2009, the airport had 12,727 aircraft operations, an average of 34 per day: 74% general aviation, 25% air taxi, and 2% military. At that time six aircraft were based here: 5 single-engine and 1 helicopter.

References

External links 

  from Nevada DOT
 
 

Airports in Nevada
Buildings and structures in Nye County, Nevada
Transportation in Nye County, Nevada